Dybuster is many systems that works to solve the problems of dyslexia and dyscalculia patients, and was developed in Eth Zurich by Christian Vögeli during 2007 in Zurich Switzerland.

Dybuster creates multi-sensory, computer based therapy systems for people with dyslexia and dyscalculia. These systems were developed at ETH Zurich and evaluated in scientific user studies together with neuropsychologists from University of Zurich.

Dybuster was founded by Christian Vögeli in 2007 as a spin-off of the Swiss Federal Institute of Technology in Zurich and has its headquarters in Zürich.

Dyslexia